Wilhelm Hirsch (11 June 1887 – 16 November 1957) was a German architect. His work was part of the architecture event in the art competition at the 1936 Summer Olympics.

References

1887 births
1957 deaths
20th-century German architects
Olympic competitors in art competitions
People from Wiesbaden